Mythologies is a 2022 ballet created by the French choreographer Angelin Preljocaj and composer Thomas Bangalter. The ballet focuses on scenes stemming from human mythologies and features original orchestral compositions from Bangalter.

Conception 
The ballet started as a collaboration between the Ballet Preljocaj and Ballet de l'Opéra de Bordeaux. Another ballet, Ghost, was created by the two companies in 2018. Mythologies uses ten participating dancers from each ballet.

In late 2019, Preljocaj approached Bangalter about composing a ballet suite with a full orchestra. Bangalter had previously hoped to compose classical music in such a setting, so a collaboration begun between the two that resulted in what would become the opera.

Synopsis 
Mythologies, led by twenty dancers, connects ancient and modern myths. The ballet focuses on "contemporary rituals" and revolves around twenty-three scenes inspired by “founding myths that shape the collective imagination.”

Music 

The music to the ballet was composed by Thomas Bangalter, formerly of Daft Punk. The 90-minute composition will be released as an album of the same name in April 2023 on vinyl, CD, and streaming services. It is the first solo project from either Bangalter or Guy-Manuel de Homem-Christo following their split and the first full-length album involving either member in a decade. Unlike the work of the duo and of Bangalter in earlier previous solo efforts, the album is not electronic and is entirely orchestral, focusing on Baroque music and American minimalism. The press release of the album included a drawing of Bangalter's unmasked face by Vulture Magazine illustrator Stéphane Manel. The album was preceded by three singles.

Personnel 

 Conductor - Romain Dumas
 Orchestra - The Orchestre National Bordeaux Aquitaine

Reception 
Critical reception of Mythologies has varied. Some critics praised the music and choreography of the show, and other critics were more critical of the general concept. Lucile Commeaux of Radio France expressed ambivalence, criticizing the ballet, both conceptually and musically, as being without a clear purpose. Philippe Noisette of Les Echos, while calling the some of the choreography uninspired, wrote more positively of the ballet, calling it ambitious and praising the compositions of Bangalter while simultaneously warning that fans of Daft Punk may be disappointed. Pétra Wauters writing for the French arts & culture magazine Wukali called Bangalter's compositions "brilliant" and talked of Preljocaj's choice of uncomfortable themes. Marianne Leroux of France Info called the show a spectacle and wrote of Preljocaj's ability to reinvent himself.

References 

Ballet
Thomas Bangalter albums